Sean Gibson (Born August 31, 1971) is an American former basketball player. He played college basketball for Indiana University – Purdue University Fort Wayne before playing professionally in Spain, Iceland, Chile and the Dominican Republic.

High school
Gibson attended Floyd Central High School in Floyds Knobs, Indiana where he played basketball alongside his brother, Shane Gibson.

College career
Gibson played for four years at Indiana University – Purdue University Fort Wayne and left the school as its all-team leader in points and rebounds.

Professional career
In 1994, Gibson joined KFÍ ahead of the 2. deild karla playoffs and helped the team win all its games and gain promotion to the 1.deild karla. He re-signed with the team the following season and gained national attention for his performances in the league after averaging close to 40 points and 17 rebounds. In the Icelandic Cup he scored 51 points against Úrvalsdeild club Tindastóll, making 19 of 20 free throws, in KFÍ's 86–80 loss.

He spent the 1996–1997 season in Spain with Viajes Aliguer.

Titles and awards

Titles
 2. deild karla winner (1994)
 Great Lakes Valley Conference winner (1993)

Awards
 Great Lakes Valley Conference Player of the Year (1993)
 Great Lakes Valley Conference All-First Team (1992, 1993)
 Purdue Fort Wayne Hall of Fame

References

External links
College profile 
Profile at Eurobasket.com
Spanish statistics

1971 births
Living people
American expatriate basketball people in Iceland
American men's basketball players
Basketball players from Indiana
Purdue Fort Wayne Mastodons men's basketball players
Centers (basketball)
Vestri men's basketball players